The United Arab Emirates toured Kenya from 25 to 31 July 2011. The tour consisted of one ICC Intercontinental Cup match and a pair of List A matches for the 2011–13 ICC Intercontinental Cup One-Day.

Intercontinental Cup

Intercontinental Cup One-Day

1st List A

2nd List A

2011 in cricket
International cricket competitions in 2011
2011 in Kenyan cricket